{{DISPLAYTITLE:A♯ (Axiom)}}

A♯ (pronounced: A sharp) is an object-oriented functional programming language distributed as a separable component of Version 2 of the Axiom computer algebra system. A# types and functions are first-class values and can be used freely together with an extensive library of data structures and other mathematical abstractions. A key design guideline for A# was suitability of compiling to portable and efficient machine code. It is distributed as free and open-source software under a BSD-like license.

Development of A# has now changed to the programming language Aldor.

A# has both an optimising compiler, and an intermediate code interpreter. The compiler can emit any of:
 Executable stand-alone programs
 Libraries, of native operating system format objects, or of portable bytecode
 Source code, for languages C, or Lisp

The following C compilers are supported: GNU Compiler Collection (GCC), Xlc, Oracle Developer Studio, Borland, Metaware, and MIPS C.

References 
 
 

Functional languages
Discontinued programming languages